Firouz (also spelled Farooz, Firuz, Pirooz, Firoz), Pirouz (also spelled Pirooz, Piruz, Piroz), Feroz (Hindi/Urdu; also spelled Feroze, Phiroze), Fayrouz, Phiroj, are masculine given names of Persian origin. It is ultimately derived from Middle Persian Pērōz (Inscriptional Pahlavi: ,), meaning "victorious, triumphant or prosperous", mentioned as Perozes in Latin and Greek sources. 

Notable figures with the name include:

People
 Abu Lu'lu'a Firuz (d. 644), Persian slave who killed the second caliph Umar
 Feroze Gandhi, an Indian politician and journalist
 Firoz Khan, known as Arjun, Indian actor
 Feroz Khan, an Indian actor, film editor, producer and director
 Feroze Khan (field hockey), a field hockey player who represented British India in the Olympics
 Feroz Abbasi, a British man held in extrajudicial detention in the United States Guantanamo Bay detainment camps in Cuba
 Feroz Khan Noon, a politician from Pakistan
 Feroz Abbas Khan, an Indian theatre and film director, playwright and screenwriter
 Firouz – a wealthy Armenian Christian convert to Islam who held a high post in Yaghi-Siyan's Seljuk Turkish government.  
 Firuz Shah Tughlaq (r. 1351–1388 CE), a ruler of the Tughlaq dynasty in India
 Firuz Kanatlı Turkish businessman, founder of Eti.
 Firuz Kazemzadeh, a professor emeritus of history at Yale University
 Firuz-Shah Zarrin-Kolah, an Iranian dignitary with Kurdish origin
 Peroz I, a king of Iran from the house of Sassanids who ruled 457–484
 Peroz II, a king of Iran from the house of Sassanids who ruled Oct. to Dec. 631 AD
 Piruz Khosrow, Persian aristocrat who murdered Queen Boran
 Peroz III, exiled Persian prince who traveled to Tang dynasty China and became a general and governor
 Peruz Terzekyan, b. Sivas 1866, a kanto singer
 Pirouz Davani, an Iranian leftist activist
 Pirouz Mojtahedzadeh, an Iranian political scientist and historian
 Farooq Feroze Khan, a Pakistan Air Force officer
 Jam Feroz, the last ruler of the Samma dynasty of Sindh
 Jalal ud din Firuz Khalji, the first Indian ruler of the Delhi Sultanate and the founder of the Khalji dynasty
 Alauddin Firuz Shah I, the son and successor of sultan Shihabuddin Bayazid Shah
 Alauddin Firuz Shah II, the son and successor of sultan Nasiruddin Nasrat Shah
 Rukn ud din Firuz, a Muslim Turkic ruler and the fourth Sultan of Delhi in medieval India
 Fairuz, a Lebanese singer
 Pherozeshah Mehta
 Shamsuddin Firoz Shah, Sultan of Bengal from 1301 to 1322

Characters
 Hajji Firuz, the traditional herald of Nowruz

Other
Pirouz (cheetah) Male Asiatic cheetah

See also
 Feroz (disambiguation)
 Piruz, Iran, a village in Hamadan

References